Glebe Rangers Football Club is an intermediate, Northern Irish football club playing in the Ballymena & Provincial Intermediate League. They hail from Ballymoney, County Antrim. They play their home games at the Riada Stadium, Ballymoney.

Admission to the League
After Omagh Town closed at the end of the 2004–05 season, the place left by their absence was not filled. Instead, it was decided that a club from the Intermediate League Second Division (in this case, Ballymoney United) was allowed to stay in the First Division instead of being relegated, with only 11 clubs playing in the Second Division for one season. At the end of the 2005–06 season, Glebe Rangers entered a two-legged play-off with Derry side Trojans to determine the vacant 12th place in the Irish Second Division.  Rangers won this play-off 9–5 on aggregate to claim the place in the league. Glebe formerly played in the Ballymena and Provincial League.

The current manager is Jason Wilmont who replaced Peter Cairns in 2014.

In 2016 the club was relegated from the Northern Ireland Football League.

References

External links
  Irish Premier League Website
  Irish Football Club Project
  Irish FA Website
  Irish League Forums
 nifootball.co.uk Fixtures, Results and Tables of all leagues
  The Infamous Glebe Rangers Football Manager Challenge
  Ballymoney & Moyle Times

Association football clubs established in 1989
Association football clubs in Northern Ireland
Association football clubs in County Antrim
1989 establishments in Northern Ireland
Ballymoney